The ski-orienteering events were introduced at the Universiade in 2019.

Events

Medalists

Men

Sprint

Middle

Pursuit

Women

Sprint

Middle

Pursuit

Mixed

Sprint relay

Medal table 
Last updated after the 2019 Winter Universiade

References 

 
Universiade
Sports at the Winter Universiade
Nordic skiing at the Winter Universiade